Pembroke Dock Military Cemetery is a burial ground for military personnel. It is located in Llanion, Pembroke Dock in Wales. It is the only dedicated military cemetery in Wales.

The cemetery is believed to have opened around 1860, the date on its earliest graves.
Forty Commonwealth service personnel who participated in the First World War and 33 from the Second World War are buried here. The most recent burial was in 1955. A Cross of Sacrifice within the cemetery grounds is used as a focal point for commemoration events.

The cemetery was forced to close to the public in 2013, when a 20-foot-deep sinkhole opened up around the grave of Private Francis Ryan. The incident was believed to have been caused by water erosion of the limestone beneath Ryan's grave. The cemetery partially reopened in January 2014 with the affected area fenced off, before clay-cement grouting was used to fill in the sinkhole, allowing the cemetery to fully reopen in April 2014.

The cemetery is owned by the Ministry of Defence and managed by the Defence Infrastructure Organisation group.

References

External links
 Pembroke Dock Military Cemetery page on Commonwealth War Graves Commission website
 

British military memorials and cemeteries
Cemeteries in Wales
Commonwealth War Graves Commission cemeteries in Wales
Pembroke Dock